Adrien Bart (born 4 September 1991) is a French sprint canoeist. He competed in the men's C-1 1000 metres event at the 2016 Summer Olympics.

References

External links
 

1991 births
Living people
French male canoeists
Olympic canoeists of France
Canoeists at the 2016 Summer Olympics
Canoeists at the 2020 Summer Olympics
Sportspeople from Orléans
European Games competitors for France
Canoeists at the 2019 European Games
ICF Canoe Sprint World Championships medalists in Canadian